Agriocnemis victoria is a species of damselfly in the family Coenagrionidae. It is native to Africa, where it is widespread in the western and central nations of the continent. Its common names include Victoria wisp and small pincer-tailed wisp.

This species is found in swamps. There are no major threats but it may be affected by pollution and habitat loss to agriculture and development.

References

Coenagrionidae
Odonata of Africa
Insects described in 1928
Taxonomy articles created by Polbot